"Rita May" (sometimes spelled as "Rita Mae") is a song by Bob Dylan, originally recorded during the sessions for the album Desire, but released only as the B-side of a single and on the compilation album, Masterpieces. The song is based on the 1957 rockabilly song "Bertha Lou". Some listeners believe that the lyrics of the song refer to writer Rita Mae Brown, who had complained of the lack of opportunities for casual lesbian sex.

Live version
Dylan rehearsed the song in New York City before the first leg of the Rolling Thunder Revue in 1975, a performance that was officially released on the Bob Dylan – The Rolling Thunder Revue: The 1975 Live Recordings box set released in 2019. The only time Dylan played the song live, however, came on the second leg of the Rolling Thunder Revue in New Orleans, Louisiana on May 3, 1976.

Notable cover
"Rita May" was covered by Jerry Lee Lewis on his 1979 album Jerry Lee Lewis.

Other songs with the same title
Eric Clapton wrote a song titled "Rita Mae" which appears on his 1981 album Another Ticket and was also released as a single, reaching No. 18 on the Mainstream Rock chart.

Personnel
Original Dylan version
Bob Dylan – guitar, vocal, harmonica
Emmylou Harris – vocal
Rob Stoner – bass
Howard Wyeth – drums
Scarlet Rivera – violin
Sheena Seidenberg – tambourine, congas
Don DeVito – Producer

References

External links
Lyrics at Bob Dylan's official site
Chords  at Dylanchords

Songs written by Bob Dylan
Bob Dylan songs
1977 singles
Songs written by Jacques Levy
Song recordings produced by Don DeVito
Jerry Lee Lewis songs
Columbia Records singles
1976 songs